Lakeview Square Mall is an enclosed shopping mall serving the city of Battle Creek, Michigan. It opened in 1983 and features no anchor stores. Previous anchor stores at the mall included Sears, J. C. Penney, Macy's (previously Hudson's and Marshall Field's), and Gilmore Brothers. Other major tenants include Barnes & Noble, Shoe Dept. Encore, and Dunham's Sports. The mall is managed by GK Development.

History
Sidney Forbes and Maurice Cohen, owners of Forbes/Cohen Properties, first announced plans for Lakeview Square in 1980. The proposal called for a mall to be located on property on Beckley Road on the south side of Battle Creek, bound to the north by I-94 and to the east by M-66. In order to construct the mall, Forbes/Cohen had to acquire a permit from the Michigan Department of Natural Resources to relocate Brickyard Creek, a creek running along the western side of the property. 

Lakeview Square opened on August 3, 1983. When it opened, the mall featured three anchor stores: JCPenney, Sears and Hudson's (which became Marshall Field's in 2001 and Macy's in 2006). One of the first expansions at the mall was a movie theater complex, which was added to the Sears wing and opened in 1995.

General Growth Properties bought the mall, along with Westwood Mall and Lansing Mall, from Forbes/Cohen in 1998. The same year, Old Navy opened at the mall, replacing a space vacated by Kalamazoo-based department store Gilmore Brothers five years prior. Dunham's Sports also opened a store at the mall in 2006, relocating from a nearby plaza. Steve & Barry's opened a store at the mall in 2007, replacing Old Navy. The Steve & Barry's went out of business during the company's bankruptcy in 2008. That space is now occupied by Shoe Department Encore. 

The mall was sold to Cushman & Wakefield in 2011, and again to GK Development in 2013.

On January 4, 2017, it was announced that Macy's would be closing as part of a plan to close 68 stores nationwide. The store closed in March 2017. On March 17, 2017, it was announced that JCPenney would also be closing on July 31, 2017 as part of a plan to close 138 stores nationwide which left Sears as the only anchor left.  After those two closures, more stores left the mall, including FYE in July 2018. On November 8, 2018, it was announced that Sears would be closing as well in February 2019 as part of a plan to close 40 stores nationwide which will leave the mall with no anchors left.

References

External links
Official site

Shopping malls established in 1983
Shopping malls in Michigan
Battle Creek, Michigan
Buildings and structures in Calhoun County, Michigan
Tourist attractions in Calhoun County, Michigan
1983 establishments in Michigan